Kariguini is a settlement in Kenya's Central Province. It is inhabited mostly by the kikuyu community just like other parts of central province.

Kariguini means a place of bananas

References 

Populated places in Central Province (Kenya)